Sahyadri School is a residential, co-educational school in India. It is run by the Krishnamurti Foundation, India (KFI) based on the views on education of philosophical speaker and writer J. Krishnamurti. The school has about 280 students and 45 teachers, and is affiliated to the ICSE.

History 
In 1986 the Foundation began planning the school. The Pune Centre of the Krishnamurti Foundation saw the birth of Sahyadri School in September 1995. Through the efforts of Shri Achyut Patwardhan, and help from many well-wishers, the school was inaugurated on 10 September 1995 (Krishnamurti Birth Centenary Year). It is the third youngest of the KFI schools.

Location 

Sahyadri school is located off the Pune-Nashik highway, approximately 25 kilometers from Rajgurunagar (Khed), overlooking the Chas-Kaman dam surrounded by gently sloping hills and valleys. The closest cities are Pune (75 km) and Mumbai (a little less than 200 km). The school is on Tiwai Hill, at an altitude of 770m above sea level, in the midst of the Sahyadri Range of Maharashtra.

See also
 Rishi Valley School, Madanapalle, Andra Pradesh, India
 Rajghat Besant School, Varanasi, India 
 The School KFI, Chennai, India
 Pathashaala KFI, Tamil Nadu, 
 The Valley School, Bengaluru, India
 Oak Grove School (Ojai, California), USA
 Jiddu Krishnamurti Schools

References

External links 
 Sahyadri School website

Boarding schools in Maharashtra
Educational institutions established in 1995
Jiddu Krishnamurti schools
Schools in Pune
1995 establishments in Maharashtra